Glass of Lemonade is an oil on canvas painting by the Dutch artist Gerard ter Borch, created around 1664. (canvas ). It is part of the State Hermitage, in St. Petersburg, where it entered in 1815 as part of the collection of Empress Josephine. The painting is exhibited in Room 249 New Hermitage. 

A replica of the painting (some researchers consider it an authorial repetition, others that it is a copy) is held in the private collection of Peter and Olga Dresmann. Glass of Lemonade is typical of ter Borch's late oeuvre, moving away from simple genre scenes to depict the private life and intimate domestic scenes of the wealthy bourgeoisie.This painting was of the first examples of Dutch domestic scenes revealing an internal psychological connection between the characters.

References

1664 paintings
Paintings by Gerard ter Borch
Paintings in the collection of the Hermitage Museum
Genre paintings